Mile Pešorda (born 15 August 1950 in Grude) is Croatian and Bosnian writer. He is a recipient of the Antun Branko Šimić Award.

References

Croatian writers
People from Grude
Living people
Croats of Bosnia and Herzegovina
1950 births